Go-to-bed or getting-into-bed matchboxes were a variety of match storage box popular in the mid-to-late 19th century. Relatively small, about 6 cm high, they were frequently made of metal of some kind, though sometimes of wood or ivory.

Most incorporated a rough surface on which the match could be struck. All featured a small hole or finial, sometimes in ivory and always part of the design, into which the lit match could be placed, rather like a miniature candle. The idea was that, rather than risk taking a lit candle near to the voluminous fabric of a four poster bed, the lit match on the mantelpiece would burn for some 30 seconds — just long enough for the person to snuff out the candle and get into bed.

Designs
There is huge variety in the designs of the matchboxes. Some were relatively simple boxes or cylindrical containers, some were barrel-shaped and made of wood or metal, while others were cast metal figures in a wide variety of designs. Private collections include castle towers, a Napoleonic soldier of the Second Empire, a Gothic knight holding a torch, a little boy selling newspapers, a bear chained to a ragged staff, and so on. Other designs feature flower sellers and exotic ladies with a separate 'basket' in which the matches were stored.

One specific variety of go-to-bed is "Prince Albert's Safety Vesta Box". This was a decorated brass tub with an embossed top. Ribbed under the base for striking matches, it had a small finial to take a single match on top, and was marked "Prince Albert's Safety Box, 150 Patent Vesta Lights".

References

See also
 Matchbox - disposable match containers.
 Phillumeny - the collecting of match related items.

Matches (firelighting)
Collecting